Breasal Ó Madadhan, Lord of Síol Anmchadha and Chief of the Name, died 1526.

The Annals of the Four Masters, sub anno 1479, state that The monastery of Meelick was founded by O'Madden, on the bank of the Shannon, in the diocese of Clonfert, for Franciscan Friars; and he chose a burial-place for himself in it. It is uncertain if this refers to Breasal, or his predecessor, Eoghan.

In 1490, the Annals of the Four Masters state that "Thomas O'Lorcan, intended Ollav to O'Madden ... died."

His obituary describes him as "a kind, brave, mild, and justly-judging man."

References
  O'Madáin: History of the O'Maddens of Hy-Many, Gerard Madden, 2004. .
 Medieval Ireland: Territorial, Political and Economic Divisions, Paul MacCotter, Four Courts Press, 2008. 
 CELT: Corpus of Electronic Texts at University College Cork
 https://archive.org/stream/tribescustomsofh00odonuoft/tribescustomsofh00odonuoft_djvu.txt

People from County Galway
Medieval Gaels from Ireland
Irish lords
16th-century Irish people
15th-century Irish people
1526 deaths
Year of birth missing